Carlesia may refer to:
 Carlesia (plant), a genus of plants  in the family Apiaceae
 Carlesia (mammal), a genus  of mammals in the family Dinomyidae
 Carlesia (reptile), a genus  of lizards in the suborder Lacertilia